Judicaël Crillon (born 21 November 1988) is a French professional footballer who plays as a left back for Luxembourgish club Racing-Union.

Professional career
Crillon spent a decade in the youth academy of AS Nancy, before beginning his early career in the lower divisions of France. He made his professional debut with Chambly in a 1–0 Ligue 2 win over Valenciennes FC on 26 July 2019.

On 18 August 2020, he signed with Racing-Union in Luxembourg.

References

External links
 
 
 

1988 births
Living people
Sportspeople from Nancy, France
French footballers
Association football fullbacks
FC Chambly Oise players
Pau FC players
LB Châteauroux players
SAS Épinal players
US Raon-l'Étape players
Racing FC Union Luxembourg players
Ligue 2 players
Championnat National players
Championnat National 2 players
Championnat National 3 players
Luxembourg National Division players
French expatriate footballers
Expatriate footballers in Luxembourg
French expatriate sportspeople in Luxembourg
Footballers from Grand Est